Sharper Image is an American brand that offers consumers home electronics, air purifiers, gifts, and other high-tech lifestyle products through its website, catalog, and third-party retailers. The brand is owned by ThreeSixty Group, with the U.S. catalog and website owned and operated by Michigan-based Camelot Venture Group.

The brand has been in operation since its relaunch in 2010. The earlier consumer products retailer by that name was founded by Richard Thalheimer and was in business from 1977 until its closing in 2008. The company sold merchandise through dozens of retail stores throughout the United States, a monthly catalog, and its website, along with business-to-business sales teams that marketed products for corporate incentive programs and wholesale to retailers.

History
The Sharper Image was founded by Richard Thalheimer. The company started in 1977 as a catalog business to sell jogging watches. Later, through their catalog, The Sharper Image expanded its product assortment to include high-end futuristic gadgets, electronics, massage chairs, and air purifiers. The Sharper Image eventually expanded to 187 retail stores in 38 states.

Bankruptcy 
Litigation involving its Ionic Breeze air purifiers sullied the brand's image. The company sued Consumer Reports for Fail ratings on ionic purifiers. In turn, the company was sued by customers for ineffective air purification.

In 2006 there was a change in the board of directors of the company, and the removal of Thalheimer as CEO. Thalheimer was replaced by Chairman Jerry W. Levin. Not long after, on April 9, 2007, Steven A. Lightman became the president and CEO.

The Sharper Image stock price reached a record low of 29 cents a share on February 20, 2008. On February 25, 2008, The Sharper Image announced it had received notification that it would be delisted from the NASDAQ exchange. The company filed for bankruptcy protection with the U.S. Bankruptcy Court in Wilmington, Delaware after four years of sales losses and three straight years of losses. Sharper Image said it had $251.5 million of assets and $199 million of debts as of January 31, 2008, according to the filing. Cash on hand totaled about $700,000. All of its retail stores were closed by the end of 2008.

On April 10, 2008, Levin resigned as a member and chairman of the board of the company.  to pursue participating with other investors to acquire some or all of the company's businesses or assets. But, as was pointed out, "Levin hasn't made a lot of money for the investors of Sharper Image he's teamed up with so far, including Under Levin, the company's stock price had fallen from about $40 three years earlier to about 23 cents (a $3.6 million market capitalization) at the time of his departure. Levin joined a group making a bid for the company; the group included hedge fund Ramius Capital, which was involved in Levin getting onto the company's board of directors, and Clinton Group, which announced a large stake in the company in December 2017.

Post-bankruptcy
On May 29, 2008, a joint venture led by units of private investment firms Hilco Consumer Capital, Infinity Lifestyle Brands, Gordon Brothers Group, and Bluestar Alliance won a bankruptcy auction to acquire the assets of The Sharper Image, paying $49 million plus some contingent recovery for the company's assets. The Sharper Image name was then licensed and used to sell products through major third-party retailers and the branded website. New products were created through partnerships with other businesses.

In 2011, Iconix Brand Group bought the Sharper Image brand and took control of all licensing relationships, while Camelot Venture Group continued to operate the catalog and website. In June 2014, Camelot Venture Group acquired the rights to the US direct-to-consumer division of the brand (catalog and e-commerce) from Iconix Brand Group.

Relaunch
In December 2016, Irvine (California)-based ThreeSixty Group, owners of brands such as FAO Schwarz and Vornado Air, purchased all remaining rights (including global manufacturing, distribution, and licensing rights) from Iconix Brand Group for US$100 million. In 2019, ThreeSixty Group relaunched Sharper Image with new logos, styling, slogans (including Tomorrow's Tomorrow), and a refreshed product assortment.

Consumer Reports lawsuit

In 2002, Consumer Reports tested many fan-driven air purifiers alongside the Sharper Image's Ionic Breeze Quadra. The Sharper Image was not happy with the results and sued Consumer Reports in order to get what they thought would be a fairer testing of the product.  However, the suit was dismissed, primarily owing to the court's finding that the company "has not shown that the test protocol used by Consumers Union was scientifically, or otherwise, invalid" and had not "demonstrated a reasonable probability that any of the challenged statements were false".  Furthermore, Sharper Image could not "come forward with any evidence from which a finding of malice could be made."

Two years later, Consumer Reports stated that the Quadra could be dangerous to consumers' health because of the trace levels of ozone produced by the unit.  As a result sales plummeted, and Sharper Image stores took back all units for a cash refund. The Sharper Image's response was to work with the Engelhard Corporation and create an ozone catalyst that reduced the amount of excess ozone in the purified air before it circulated throughout the room.

References

External links
The Sharper Image website

1977 establishments in California
Companies based in San Francisco
Companies disestablished in 2008
Companies that filed for Chapter 11 bankruptcy in 2008
Retail companies established in 1977
Retail companies disestablished in 2008
Re-established companies
2011 mergers and acquisitions
2016 mergers and acquisitions
Defunct retail companies of the United States